Fides was an Italian professional cycling team that existed in 1961. Arnaldo Pambianco won the general classification of the 1961 Giro d'Italia with the team.

Team roster
The following is a list of riders on the Fides squad during the 1961 season, with age given for 1 January 1961.

References

External links

Cycling teams based in Italy
Defunct cycling teams based in Italy
1961 establishments in Italy
1961 disestablishments in Italy
Cycling teams established in 1961
Cycling teams disestablished in 1961